Connor O'Brien, 3rd Earl of Thomond also spelt Conor and called Groibleach, or the "long-nailed", (1535–1581) fought his uncle Donnell over his father's succession during thirty years from 1535 to 1565. He was confirmed as 3rd Earl of Thomond in 1558 by the Lord Deputy of Ireland, Thomas Radclyffe, 3rd Earl of Sussex. O'Brien intrigued with fitz Maurice in 1569 during the 1st Desmond Rebellion and fled to France. He returned and was pardoned in 1571, being restored to his lands at the end of the rebellion in 1573.

Birth and origins 
Connor was born in 1535, the eldest son of Donogh O'Brien and his wife Helen Butler. His father was the 2nd Earl of Thomond. He had obtained the earldom by an agreement by which he succeeded his uncle Murrough O'Brien, 1st Earl of Thomond as 2nd earl. His father's family, the O'Briens, were a Gaelic Irish dynasty that descended from Brian Boru, medieval high king of Ireland.

His mother was the youngest daughter of Piers Butler, 8th Earl of Ormond. His mother's family, the Butlers, were an Old English dynasty that descended from Theobald Walter, who had been appointed Chief Butler of Ireland by King Henry II in 1177.

Succession dispute 
O'Brien should have normally succeeded his father on his death on 1 April 1553 as the third earl of Thomond according to English primogeniture. However, at that time O'Brien was only 18; he would have become a ward and the lands would have reverted to the crown until his coming of age. To avoid a wardship, his father appointed O'Brien's uncle Donnell as his tanist (successor) according to Brehon law. His uncle Donnell was formally inaugurated as the O'Brien (chief of the name) and chieftain of the Dal Cais (Dalcassians). He usurped the earldom but was never recognised as earl, whereas O'Brien was counted as the 3rd Earl.

Obliged to surrender Clonroad Castle (near Ennis), the usual residence of his parents, Thomond, as he now was, retreated to Doonmulvihill Castle, on the borders of Galway. Even there he was pursued and besieged by Donnell but relieved by his cousin Thomas Butler, 10th Earl of Ormond.

Subsequently, Donnell petitioned for official recognition as chief of Thomond, and St. Leger, though unable to grant his request, promised to write to Queen Mary in his favour. Matters continued in this uncertain state till the summer of 1558, when the Earl of Sussex, having marched to Limerick with a large army, caused Donnell, Teige and Donough, sons of Murrough, 1st Earl of Thomond, to be proclaimed traitors, and Thomond to be reinstated in his possessions.

Donnell took refuge with Maguire in Fermanagh, and Teige and Donough found a powerful protector in Gerald FitzGerald, 14th Earl of Desmond.

Marriages

First marriage 
Thomond's first marriage was childless. His bride probably was Evelyn, also called Ellen, daughter of Donal MacCarthy and widow (his 4th wife) of James FitzGerald, 13th Earl of Desmond. His marriage was short: they married in 1559 but she died in 1560 and was buried in Muckross Abbey. However, according to a minority view, she was Joan, daughter of Thomas, 16th Baron of Kerry.

Second marriage and children 
After the death of his first wife in 1560, Thomond married secondly Una, daughter of Turlough O'Brien-Arra in the barony of Owney and Arra, County Tipperary.

 
Connor and Una had three sons:
 Donogh (died 1624), his successor, the 4th Earl of Thomond
 Teige, of Dromore Castle (died ), married 1st Siana, daughter of Teige McMorough; and 2ndly Joan, daughter of Sir Dermot Shaughnessy and widow of Sir William Bourke
 Daniel (died 1663), created 1st Viscount Clare
 Hugh

—and three daughters:
 Mary, wife of Turlough Roe MacMahon of Corcovaskin
 Margaret, second wife of James Butler, 2nd Lord Dunboyne
 Honora, first wife of Thomas Fitzmaurice, 18th Lord Kerry

Resumption of the succession dispute 
Peace prevailed for a brief season, and Thomond won Sussex's approbation for his good execution of justice. But in 1559 his uncles Teige and Donough returned to Inchiquin, and not merely defied Thomond's efforts to oust them, but, with the assistance of the Earl of Desmond, actually inflicted a sharp defeat on him and his ally, the Earl of Clanricarde, at the Battle of Spancel Hill. Teige was shortly afterwards arrested by Lord-justice William FitzWilliam, and confined in Dublin Castle; but early in 1562 he escaped, and, being joined by Donnell, they opposed Thomond with a formidable army. With the help of some ordnance lent him by Sussex, Thomond succeeded in wresting Ballyally and Ballycarhy from them; and eventually, in April 1565, having reduced the country to a wilderness, Donnell consented to surrender his claim to the lordship of Thomond on condition of receiving Corcomroe. War broke out again in the following year; but the resources of the combatants were exhausted, and Sidney, when he visited Limerick in April 1567, described it as utterly impoverished owing to Thomond's "insufficiency to govern".

First Desmond Rebellion 
The suspicion with which Thomond was regarded made him discontented, and on 8 July 1569 he entered into a league with the "archtraitor" fitz Maurice (d. 1579). In February 1570 Thomond attacked the President of Connaught, Sir Edward Fitton, at Ennis, and compelled him to seek refuge in Galway. A strong force under the Earl of Ormond was immediately despatched against him, and a few weeks later he submitted unconditionally. But being "seized with sorrow and regret for having surrendered his towns and prisoners", and determined never to "submit himself to the law, or to the mercy of the council of Ireland", he fled in the beginning of June to France.

In Paris Thomond introduced himself on 18 July to Sir Henry Norris, 1st Baron Norreys, the English ambassador, and, after protesting his loyalty, begged him to intercede with Queen Elizabeth for his pardon. Norris, who thought him a "barbarous man", wanting "neither vainglory or deceitfulness, and yet in his talk very simple", soon became aware that he was intriguing with the French court, and urged Elizabeth to coax him home at any price. Elizabeth, though she spoke of him as a "person of small value" and declined to pardon him beforehand, was sufficiently alive to his power to do mischief, and promised if he returned to give his grievances a favourable hearing. But Thomond showed no disposition to leave Paris, and Norris was forced to lend him a hundred crowns and make endless promises before he would consent to take his departure.

Later life 
Thomond returned to Ireland in December, and, having made public confession of his treason to Sir Henry Sidney, he was pardoned in April 1571. He surrendered his lands to the queen and obtained permission to go to England to solicit their restoration, but, owing to the rebellion of the Earl of Clanricarde's sons, his presence was required in Ireland. He won the approval of the lord deputy and council, and a warrant was apparently given in June 1573 for the restoration of his lands. In December 1575 he went to Cork to show his respect to the lord-deputy, Sir Henry Sidney, whom he attended to Limerick and Galway, whither the principal men of Thomond repaired to him. "And finding that the mutuall Hurtes and Revenges donne betwixt the Earle and Teige MacMurrough Avas one great Cawse of the Ruyne of the Country", Sidney "bounde theim by Bondes, in great sommes", to surrender their lands, and to submit to the appointment of Donnell, created Sir Donnell O'Brien, as sheriff of the newly constituted county of Clare. This arrangement, though acquiesced in, was naturally displeasing to Thomond, and he was reputed to have said that he repented ever "condescending to the queen's mercy".

The arrangement did not put an end to the disputes between him and Teige, and in 1577 Sir William Drury was compelled to place the county under martial government. Thomond thereupon travelled to England, and on 7 October warrant was given a new patent containing the full effect of his former patent, with remainder to his son Donough, baron of Ibrickan. He returned to Ireland about Christmas; but before his arrival, according to the "Four Masters", "the marshal had imposed a severe burden on his people, so that they were obliged to become tributary to the sovereign, and pay a sum of ten pounds for every barony, and this was the first tribute ever paid by the Dal Cais". Thomond, however, seems to have lived on good terms with the new president of Connaught, Sir Nicholas Malby.

Death and timeline 
Thomond died early in 1581 aged 45 and was buried at Ennis Friary. He was succeeded by his eldest son, Donough, baron of Ibrickan and 4th earl of Thomond.

Notes and references

Notes

Citations

Sources 

 
 
  – (for Thomond)
  – S to T (for Thomond)
  – Canonteign to Cutts (for Clancarty & Clare)
 
  – Scotland and Ireland
 
  – (for timeline)

Further reading 
  – Earls

1535 births
1581 deaths
16th-century Irish people
Earls of Thomond
Irish chiefs of the name
Irish soldiers
Connor
People from County Clare
People of Elizabethan Ireland
Year of birth uncertain